A Regatta is a series of boat races.

Regatta may also refer to:

 Regatta (clothing), a British clothing brand
 Reggatta de Blanc, a 1979 album by the band The Police
 Reggatta de Blanc (instrumental), a song from the album
 Fiat Regata, an automobile produced from 1983 to 1990